William Jones Skilton (born August 16, 1940) is an American Anglican bishop. He was the first suffragan bishop of the Episcopal Diocese of South Carolina.

Biography
Skilton was born in Havana, Cuba. He arrived in the United States at the age of 16 and studied at The Citadel, from where he graduated in 1962. He also studied at the University of the South and graduated in theology in 1965. He was ordained deacon in 1965 and priest on January 23, 1966 in Old St. Andrew's Parish Church, Charleston, South Carolina. After ordination, he served as vicar of All Saints' Church in La Romana, Dominican Republic until 1972. He then became priest-in-charge of Holy Trinity and Cross Church in Bluffton, South Carolina and from 1973 and 1976, he also subsequently served as canon of the cathedral chapter of the Cathedral of St Luke and St Paul. In 1976, he became rector of Trinity Church in Charleston, South Carolina. In 1985, he returned to the Dominican Republic to serve as vicar of Epiphany Church, among other posts. From 1988 till 1996, he served as rector of St Thomas' Church in North Charleston, South Carolina.

He was elected Suffragan Bishop of South Carolina, the first to hold such a post, on October 7, 1995, on the forth ballot. He was then consecrated on March 2, 1996 by Presiding Bishop Edmond L. Browning, in the Cathedral of St Luke and St Paul. He retired on December 31, 2006. Later it was revealed that he was asked to resign by Standing Committee of the diocese, to make way for the election of Mark Lawrence as diocesan bishop. He was awarded a Doctor of Divinity from The Citadel in 2006.

He resigned his orders at the Episcopal Church, on effect since 6 December 2020, due to his opposition to the liberal theology of the church. He joined the Anglican Church in North America afterwards, being licensed to preach at the Anglican Diocese of South Carolina, starting in January 2021. He is currently a Retired Suffragan Bishop at the diocese.

References

External links
First Suffragan for South Carolina

American Episcopalians
American Episcopal priests
Living people
1940 births
Cuban emigrants to the United States
Bishops of the Anglican Church in North America
21st-century Anglican bishops
Episcopal bishops of South Carolina
21st-century American clergy